Moss Vale railway station is a heritage-listed railway station on the Main South line in New South Wales, Australia. It serves the town of Moss Vale. It opened on 2 December 1867 as Sutton Forest, being renamed in 1877. It was added to the New South Wales State Heritage Register on 2 April 1999.

History

Moss Vale station opened as Suttons Forest on 2 December 1867. It was the terminus of the line until the extension to Marulan on 6 August 1868. The station was renamed to Moss Vale in 1877.

In March 1999, a refuelling and stabling facility for Endeavour railcars was built to the north of the station.

Platforms & services
Moss Vale has an island platform with two sides. It is serviced by NSW TrainLink Southern Highlands Line services from Campbelltown, morning services to Sydney Central and 1 early morning & evening services to Goulburn.

It is also serviced by NSW TrainLink Xplorer and XPT long-distance services from Sydney to Canberra, Griffith and Melbourne.

Transport links
NSW TrainLink also operate road coach services to Bundanoon, Goulburn and Wollongong from the station forecourt.

Description

The original station building is a second-class brick building built by W. & A. Elphinstone in 1867. Alterations were made in 1890, including improvements to the Governor's waiting room and chandeliers. A two-storey hotel and refreshment room was added in 1891. The awning to the down platform was added in 1914 and the brick booking office in 1915. Alterations were made to the refreshment room in 1919, involving the conversion of the bar to a dining room and the construction of a new bar.

The station has an unusually wide island platform, which is connected to the station entrance and the street by a pedestrian overpass. The platform included a garden and a private dining room for Governor Belmore who spent the summers in nearby Throsby Park from 1870 to 1872. The dining room had to be big enough for a cook to prepare simple dishes and for a footman to serve. The current up platform was built in brick and lengthened in 1882. The new down platform was constructed in 1914 following duplication, with road bridge access and car turning area, specifically to enable Governor Gerald Strickland's disabled daughter to access the train.

The two-storey hip-roof timber signal box in the yard and the two metal-framed pedestrian bridges both date from 1915. The station precinct also contains a dock platform, road overbridge at the up end, weighbridge and triangle to turn 57 class locomotives. The pedestrian approach from the east side, brick walls and embankment, station forecourt and signs are all included in the station's heritage listing.

There is a grassy area at the south end of the station, with picnic tables in between the platforms. A dock platform previously existed at the northern end of Platform 1 for services to Wollongong, but this track has since been lifted. Immediately north of the station, is the junction for the Unanderra line.

The former stationmaster's residence, completed in 1874, was based on a standard design from the office of Commissioner John Whitton. In 1918, the Residence was converted for use as dormitory for female staff employed within the Railway Refreshment Room. An entrance porch was added in 1926. The Residence was adapted again, in 1952, into two separate apartments for railway staff. The works included the installation of timber partitions, an access cut through the northern wall and new internal door openings. It was leased to the Wingecarribee Shire Council to house the Southern Highlands Regional Gallery in 1994, at which time it saw the erection of a new pergola and a new southern extension, the removal of the eastern Railway outbuildings, and all the internal doors removed for ease of movement through the gallery. It had returned to residential use by 2001.

Heritage listing 
Moss Vale is one of the most important station groups in the State. It contains rare examples of early buildings, various later structures, vice-regal buildings, unique entry arrangement, very high quality buildings and the remains of a working yard seen in the signal box and embankments. The early elements of the site are significant buildings in their own right. The site has excellent interiors along with the outstanding architecture and gives many opportunities to demonstrate the wealth and range of railway structures and the importance of rail travel in the past. The site has a strong social historical connection through use by the Governors and is an important focal point of the town of Moss Vale.

Moss Vale railway station was listed on the New South Wales State Heritage Register on 2 April 1999.

See also

 Argyle Street railway bridge, Moss Vale
 List of regional railway stations in New South Wales

References

Bibliography

Attribution

External links

Moss Vale station details Transport for New South Wales

John Whitton railway stations
Railway stations in Australia opened in 1867
Regional railway stations in New South Wales
New South Wales State Heritage Register
Moss Vale, New South Wales
Articles incorporating text from the New South Wales State Heritage Register
Main Southern railway line, New South Wales